A Great Day in Harlem may refer to:

 A Great Day in Harlem (photograph), a 1958 black-and-white group portrait of 57 notable jazz musicians
 A Great Day in Harlem (film), a 1994 American documentary film about the photograph